Stefan Udovičić (born 20 September 1991) is a Bosnian football midfielder who most recently played for Slovak third-tier side ŠK 1923 Gabčíkovo.

Club career
Born in Banja Luka, SR Bosnia and Herzegovina, then still within Yugoslavia, Udovičić moved abroad at a young age to Austria. He joined the academy of FC Red Bull Salzburg in February 2007. Udovičić then joined German club, ESV Freilassing, in the summer 2007. In the beginning of 2008, Udovičić returned to Austria and joined 6th level SV Austria Salzburg. He was used in a few friendly games for the first team, but however, he didn't make it to the first team squad and was registered for the club's U23 team. However, he did play a few games for the first team as well.

In 2008, he returned to Serbia with SuperLiga side FK Čukarički and was promoted to the first team in the 2010–11 season.  Then he moved to another Serbian top-flight side, FK Radnički 1923, but he failed to make any league appearances, so he returned to Bosnia and signed FK Radnik Bijeljina.  His next stop was newly promoted Bosnian Premier League side OFK Gradina.  In summer 2013 he moved to FK Leotar.

Ahead of the 2019-20 season, Udovičić joined Slovak club ŠK 1923 Gabčíkovo.

International career
In June 2009 he was part of the Bosnia and Herzegovina U-19 team.

References

External links
 
 Stefan Udovičić at Futbalnet

1991 births
Living people
Sportspeople from Banja Luka
Serbs of Bosnia and Herzegovina
Association football midfielders
Bosnia and Herzegovina footballers
Bosnia and Herzegovina youth international footballers
SV Austria Salzburg players
FK Čukarički players
FK Radnički 1923 players
FK Radnik Bijeljina players
OFK Gradina players
FK Leotar players
NK Bratstvo Gračanica players
FK Olimpik players
FK Radnički Lukavac players
NK Čelik Zenica players
ŠK 1923 Gabčíkovo players
Serbian SuperLiga players
Premier League of Bosnia and Herzegovina players
3. Liga (Slovakia) players
Bosnia and Herzegovina expatriate footballers
Bosnia and Herzegovina expatriate sportspeople in Austria
Bosnia and Herzegovina expatriate sportspeople in Germany
Bosnia and Herzegovina expatriate sportspeople in Serbia
Bosnia and Herzegovina expatriate sportspeople in Slovakia
Expatriate footballers in Austria
Expatriate footballers in Germany
Expatriate footballers in Serbia
Expatriate footballers in Slovakia